WYNK-FM (101.5 MHz) – branded 101.5 WYNK – is a commercial country radio station licensed to serve Baton Rouge, Louisiana. Owned by iHeartMedia, the station covers the Baton Rouge metropolitan area and is the local affiliate for The Bobby Bones Show. The WYNK studios are located in Baton Rouge, while the station transmitter resides in nearby Plaquemine. Besides a standard analog transmission, WYNK is available online via iHeartRadio.

History
The FM adjunct to WYNK (1380 AM), WYNK-FM signed on the air on September 1, 1968, owned by the Miss Lou Broadcasting Corporation. The two stations simulcast country music, WYNK-FM has kept the same call letters and country format ever since.

Originally powered at 33,300 watts, WYNK-FM got a boost to 100,000 watts in the early 1970s, then relocated to a taller tower in the early 1980s, allowing the station to be heard from New Orleans to Lafayette. McGregor sold WYNK and WYNK-FM in the 1980s to Narragansett Broadcasting, a company that would eventually be acquired by Capstar.

In 2000, Capstar merged with San Antonio-based Clear Channel Communications; WYNK was sold to Davidson Media in 2007, switching to a Christian radio format. In 2014, Clear Channel changed its name to iHeartMedia, after its successful iHeartRadio streaming platform.

WYNK-FM originally served as the flagship station for nationally syndicated Big D and Bubba from 1999 until 2003; the program currently airs on competing station WTGE.

References

External links

Radio stations in Louisiana
Country radio stations in the United States
Radio stations established in 1968
1968 establishments in Louisiana
IHeartMedia radio stations